Uto-Aztecan, Uto-Aztekan  or (rarely in English) Uto-Nahuatl is a family of indigenous languages of the Americas, consisting of over thirty languages. Uto-Aztecan languages are found almost entirely in the Western United States and Mexico. The name of the language family was created to show that it includes both the Ute language of Utah and the Nahuan languages (also known as Aztecan) of Mexico.

The Uto-Aztecan language family is one of the largest linguistic families in the Americas in terms of number of speakers, number of languages, and geographic extension. The northernmost Uto-Aztecan language is Shoshoni, which is spoken as far north as Salmon, Idaho, while the southernmost is the Pipil language of El Salvador and Nicaragua. Ethnologue gives the total number of languages in the family as 61, and the total number of speakers as 1,900,412. Speakers of Nahuatl languages account for over 85% of these.

The internal classification of the family often divides it into two branches: a northern branch including all the languages of the US and a southern branch including all the languages of Mexico, although it is still being discussed whether this is best understood as a genetic classification or as a geographical one. Below this level of classification the main branches are well accepted: Numic (including languages such as Comanche and Shoshoni) and the Californian languages (formerly known as the Takic group, including Cahuilla and Luiseño) account for most of the Northern languages. Hopi and Tübatulabal are languages outside those groups. The Southern languages are divided into the Tepiman languages (including O'odham and Tepehuán), the Tarahumaran languages (including Raramuri and Guarijio), the Cahitan languages (including Yaqui and Mayo), the Coracholan languages (including Cora and Huichol), and the Nahuan languages.

The homeland of the Uto-Aztecan languages is generally considered to have been in the Southwestern United States or possibly Northwestern Mexico. An alternative theory has proposed the possibility that the language family originated in southern Mexico, within the Mesoamerican language area, but this has not been generally considered convincing.

Geographic distribution
Uto-Aztecan languages are spoken in the North American mountain ranges and adjacent lowlands of the western United States (in the states of Oregon, Idaho, Montana, Utah, California, Nevada, Arizona) and of Mexico (states of Sonora, Chihuahua, Nayarit, Durango, Zacatecas, Jalisco, Michoacán, Guerrero, San Luis Potosí, Hidalgo, Puebla, Veracruz, Morelos, Estado de México, and Ciudad de México). Classical Nahuatl, the language of the Aztecs, and its modern relatives are part of the Uto-Aztecan family.  The Pipil language, an offshoot of Nahuatl, spread to Central America by a wave of migration from Mexico, and formerly had many speakers there. Now it has gone extinct in Guatemala, Honduras, and Nicaragua, and it is nearly extinct in western El Salvador, all areas dominated by use of Spanish.

Uto-Aztecan-speaking communities in and around Mexico

Classification

History of classification
Uto-Aztecan has been accepted by linguists as a language family since the early 1900s, and six subgroups are generally accepted as valid: Numic, Takic, Pimic, Taracahitic, Corachol, and Aztecan. That leaves two ungrouped languages: Tübatulabal and Hopi (sometimes termed "isolates within the family"). Some recent studies have begun to question the unity of Taracahitic and Takic and computer-assisted statistical studies have begun to question some of the long-held assumptions and consensuses.  As to higher-level groupings, disagreement has persisted since the 19th century. Presently scholars also disagree as to where to draw language boundaries within the dialect continua.

The similarities among the Uto-Aztecan languages were noted as early as 1859 by J. C. E. Buschmann, but he failed to recognize the genetic affiliation between the Aztecan branch and the rest. He ascribed the similarities between the two groups to diffusion. Daniel Garrison Brinton added the Aztecan languages to the family in 1891 and coined the term Uto-Aztecan. John Wesley Powell, however, rejected the claim in his own classification of North American indigenous languages (also published in 1891). Powell recognized two language families: "Shoshonean" (encompassing Takic, Numic, Hopi, and Tübatulabal) and "Sonoran" (encompassing Pimic, Taracahitan, and Corachol). In the early 1900s Alfred L. Kroeber filled in the picture of the Shoshonean group, while Edward Sapir proved the unity among Aztecan, "Sonoran", and "Shoshonean". Sapir's applications of the comparative method to unwritten Native American languages are regarded as groundbreaking.  argued for a three-way division of Shoshonean, Sonoran and Aztecan, following Powell.

As of about 2011, there is still debate about whether to accept the proposed basic split between "Northern Uto-Aztecan" and "Southern Uto-Aztecan" languages. Northern Uto-Aztecan corresponds to Powell's "Shoshonean", and the latter is all the rest: Powell's "Sonoran" plus Aztecan. Northern Uto-Aztecan was proposed as a genetic grouping by Jeffrey Heath in  based on morphological evidence, and Alexis Manaster Ramer in  adduced phonological evidence in the form of a sound law. Terrence Kaufman in  accepted the basic division into Northern and Southern branches as valid. Other scholars have rejected the genealogical unity of either both nodes or the Northern node alone. Wick R. Miller's argument was statistical, arguing that Northern Uto-Aztecan languages displayed too few cognates to be considered a unit. On the other hands he found the number of cognates among Southern Uto-Aztecan languages to suggest a genetic relation. Reviewing the debate,  considers the evidence in favor of the genetic unity of Northern Uto-Aztecan to be convincing, but remains agnostic on the validity of Southern Uto-Aztecan as a genetic grouping.  also considered the North/South split to be valid based on phonological evidence, confirming both groupings.  adduced further evidence for the unity of Southern Uto-Aztecan as a valid grouping.

 also rejected the validity of the Takic grouping decomposing it into a Californian areal grouping together with Tubatulabal.

Some classifications have posited a genetic relation between Corachol and Nahuan (e.g. ). Kaufman recognizes similarities between Corachol and Aztecan, but explains them by diffusion instead of genetic evolution. Most scholars view the breakup of Proto-Uto-Aztecan as a case of the gradual disintegration of a dialect continuum.

Present scheme
The classification reflects the decision to split up the previous Taracahitic and Takic groups, that are no longer considered to be valid genetic units. Whether the division between Northern and Southern languages is best understood as geographical or phylogenetic is under discussion. The table contains demographic information about number of speakers and their locations based on data from The Ethnologue. The table also contains links to a selected bibliography of grammars, dictionaries on many of the individual languages.(† = extinct)

In addition to the above languages for which linguistic evidence exists, it is suspected that among dozens of now extinct, undocumented or poorly known languages of northern Mexico, many were Uto-Aztecan.

Extinct languages

A large number of languages known only from brief mentions are thought to have been Uto-Aztecan languages that became extinct before being documented.

Proposed external relations

An "Aztec–Tanoan" macrofamily that unites the Uto-Aztecan languages with the Tanoan languages of the southwestern United States was first proposed by Edward Sapir in the early 20th century, and later supported with potential lexical evidence by other scholars. This proposal has received much criticism about the validity of the proposed cognate sets and has been largely abandoned by the end of the last century as unproven.

Proto-Uto-Aztecan

References

Sources

Individual languages

External links

Uto-Aztecan.org, a website devoted to the comparative study of the Uto-Aztecan language family
Swadesh vocabulary lists for Uto-Aztecan languages (from Wiktionary's Swadesh-list appendix)

 
Language families
Indigenous languages of California
Indigenous languages of Mexico
Indigenous languages of the North American Southwest
Indigenous languages of the North American Great Basin
Indigenous languages of the Southwestern United States
Agglutinative languages
Mesoamerican languages
Indigenous languages of North America